Asha Rawat (born 16 February 1982) is an Indian former cricketer who played as a right-handed batter. She appeared in one Test match and 20 One Day Internationals for India between 2005 and 2008. She played domestic cricket for Delhi and Railways.

References

External links
 
 

1982 births
Living people
Cricketers from Delhi
Indian women cricketers
India women Test cricketers
India women One Day International cricketers
Delhi women cricketers
Railways women cricketers
North Zone women cricketers
Central Zone women cricketers